Jules-Carpentier Ecological Reserve is an ecological reserve in Quebec, Canada. It was established on May 18, 2000.

References

External links
 Official website from Government of Québec

Protected areas of Capitale-Nationale
Nature reserves in Quebec
Protected areas established in 2000
2000 establishments in Quebec